The 1956 Cork Senior Hurling Championship was the 68th staging of the Cork Senior Hurling Championship since its establishment by the Cork County Board in 1887. The championship ended on 14 October 1956.

St. Finbarr's entered the championship as the defending champions.

On 14 October 1956, Blackrock won the championship following a 2-10 to 2-02 defeat of Glen Rovers in the final. This was their 22nd championship title overall and their first title since 1931.

Pat Healy was the championship's top scorer with 8-03.

Team changes

To Championship

Promoted from the Cork Intermediate Hurling Championship
 Youghal

From Championship

Regraded to the Cork Intermediate Hurling Championship
 Bandon
 Shanballymore

Declined to field a team
 Imokilly

Results

First round

Second round

Semi-finals

Final

Championship statistics

Top scorers

Top scorers overall

Miscellaneous

 Blackrock win their first title since 1931

References

Cork Senior Hurling Championship
Cork Senior Hurling Championship